The 2016 Summer Olympics, officially known as the "Games of the XXXI Olympiad", was an international multi-sport event held in Rio de Janeiro, Brazil, from August 5 to August 21, 2016.

Events took place at eighteen existing venues (eight of which require some redevelopment), nine new venues constructed for the Summer Games, and seven temporary venues which will be removed following the games. Each event was held in one of four geographically segregated Olympic clusters: Barra, Copacabana, Deodoro, Engenho de Dentro and Maracanã. The same was done for the 2007 Pan American Games. Several of the venues are located at the Barra Cluster Olympic Park. The largest venue at the games in terms of seating capacity is the Estádio do Maracanã, officially known as Jornalista Mário Filho Stadium, which can hold 74,738 spectators and served as the official Olympic Stadium, hosting the opening and closing ceremonies as well as football finals. In addition, five venues outside Rio de Janeiro hosted football events, in the cities of Brasília, Belo Horizonte, Manaus, Salvador and São Paulo.

For the first time since the 1900 Summer Olympics, the Opening and Closing Ceremonies for the Summer Olympics aren't being held in the same place as athletics events, and all gymnastics events will take place in the same arena.

Venues

Notes 
1. Although the Opening Ceremony of the Olympics occurred on 5 August, football matches began on 3 August.

References

External links 
 
 
 
Olympic Games - Facilities - Barra Region (brasil2016.gov.br)
Venues of the 2016 Summer Olympics on Google Maps
Rio 2016 Summer Olympics Venues on Touchify

 
venues
2016
2016 Summer Paralympics